Otholobium dreweae is an upright shrublet assigned to the Pea family of about  high, that appears after the vegetation burned down from the underground rootstock and forms mat-like clumps of hardly branching, leafy stems. The stems are set with stiff, entire, alternate leaves with a single leaflet and heads consisting of 12-18 initially dark pink, later white, pea-like flowers with a white nectar guide on a peduncle as long as the leaves at the end of the stem. This species is an endemic of the Kleinrivier Mountains in the Western Cape province of South Africa. It mostly flowers in November.

Description 
Otholobium dreweae is a small, largely herbaceous subshrub, without dot-like glands, that regrows from an underground rootstock after a fire destroyed the vegetation and forms large, often mat-like clumps. In contrast to most Otholobium species, the leaf only consists of one leaflet. It in turn carries the leaflet that can also be shed separately. The first leaflets to appear are more or less circular and smaller than those higher up the stem.

A persistent bract subtends each individual flower. The calyx has thick, netted veins, is covered on the outside by very short erect white hairs and long black hairs and hairless on the inside.

As in most Faboideae, the corolla is zygomorph, forms a specialized structure and consists of 5 free, initially dark pink petals that later fade to white. It is broadly oval in shape, without appendages but with prominent auricles. The pistil it topped by a pinhead shaped stigma covered with brush-like hairs.

Differences with related species 
Otholobium dreweae can be distinguished from O. thomii that is a semi-erect or decumbent (not erect) plant with initially densely hairy (not sparsely hairy), pliable (not stiff) leaves, that each have at their base 2 softly hairy, broadly oval lance-shaped stipules with a pointy tip (not hairless and awl-shaped), each triplet of flowers is subtended by a lance-shaped bract that is shed quickly (not egg-shaped and persistent), and its petals are light to deep purple in colour (not dark pink that fades to white).

O. lanceolatum and O. rotundifolium are woody shrublets with cylindrical stems covered with dot-like glands and distantly set leaves (not densely leafy with ridged, herbaceous stems without dots), with pale mauve or white petals (not light to deep purple).

O. zeyheri in which the leaves that are higher on the stems have 3 leaflets (not all leaves with just one leaflet), carries spikes that consist of 25-30 sets of 3 flowers, on a stalk that is 4-5 times longer than the subtending leaf (not 3-9 triplets on an inflorescence stalk just 1-2 times longer).

Taxonomy 
As far as known, Priscilla B. Drewe first collected this species for science in November 1986 in the Fernkloof Nature Reserve. Charles Stirton and A. Muthama Muasya together described this species in 2017, and called it Otholobium dreweae. The name of the genus Otholobium is a combination of the Greek words ὠθέω (ōthéō) meaning to push and λοβός (lobos) meaning pod, which Stirton selected because its fruit seems to be pushed out of the calyx. The species was named to honor Mrs Drewe, curator of the Hermanus Herbarium, for her part in the inventory of the plants in the surroundings of Hermanus.

Conservation, distribution, habitat and ecology 
Otholobium dreweae is considered to be a vulnerable species, which is at risk due to an invasion of alien species in the area. It is only known from two locations in the Kleinrivier Mountains near Hermanus at approximately 400 m altitude that are about 1 km apart. Here it forms dense clumps growing in full sun on bands of shale in a vegetation type called mountain fynbos. The species resprouts from an underground rootstock after a fire destroyed the local vegetation, and it flowers within the first year and occasionally in the subsequent year, around November. It produces only few seeds per plant.

References

External links 
 some photos

Otholobium dreweae
Endemic flora of South Africa
Plants described in 2017